LaTavia Marie Roberson (born November 1, 1981) is an American R&B singer. She rose to fame in the late 1990s as an original member of the R&B group Destiny's Child, one of the world's best-selling girl groups of all time. During her time as a member, Roberson recorded two studio albums, sold over 25 million records and won two Grammy Awards and three Soul Train Music Awards.

Following her departure from the group, Roberson briefly formed the girl group Anjel, which also included former Destiny's Child member LeToya Luckett. Roberson has starred in various stage plays including Those Jeans, How to Love, and Not My Family. In 2014, she became a main cast-member for R&B Divas: Atlanta alongside singers such as Angie Stone, Keke Wyatt and long-time friend Meelah of 702.

Early life 

Roberson was born on November 1, 1981, in Houston, Texas, to Cheryl Lastrap and Terry Roberson. In the 1980s, before joining Destiny's Child, Roberson was a child model, appearing in commercials such as Soft and Beautiful's Just for Me Hair Care relaxer for kids.

Career

1990–2000: Girl's Tyme and Destiny's Child 
When LaTavia was eight years old, she auditioned to be a rapper and dancer in a local girl group and was one of many girls selected. She met Beyoncé Knowles at this audition, and the two became best friends. Singing and dancing with other young girls, LaTavia and Beyoncé made a video for a song called "One Time" which almost led to them becoming a duo. LaTavia then met Kelly Rowland in elementary school. After hearing Rowland sing, LaTavia told her to try out for the group, which she did. Initially, due to her duties as a rapper and dancer, LaTavia did not sing; subsequently, she had vocal lessons and began singing at local events. LaTavia got her break when she entered the singing competition TV show Star Search, alongside Beyoncé, Kelly, Tamar Davis and LaTavia's cousins Nikki and Nina Taylor. The group, then named Girl's Tyme, were heartbroken after losing the competition to Skeleton Crew. Beyonce's father Mathew Knowles began managing the group and changed the line-up, reducing it to a quartet, consisting of LaTavia, Beyoncé, Kelly, and Beyoncé's elementary school friend LeToya Luckett. The group also underwent several name changes: The Dolls, Something Fresh, Cliché, and Destiny.

In 1995, they signed to Elektra Records, but were later dropped from the label. D'wayne Wiggins soon began working on music with the group, briefly signing them to Grass Roots Entertainment. The Wiggins produced song "Killing Time" was included on the Men in Black soundtrack. After plenty of training to become prepared and ready for the music industry, they were signed by Columbia Records in 1997 under the name, Destiny's Child with Knowles as lead vocalist, Rowland as second-lead vocalist, and Roberson and Luckett as background vocalists. Roberson was the alto, adding the low notes, and Luckett was the soprano, adding the high notes to the group's harmony. Roberson was also designated as the group's spokesperson. In early 1998, Destiny's Child released their self-titled debut album Destiny's Child. The singles were "No, No, No" featuring Wyclef Jean and "With Me". Roberson can be heard rapping in the song "Illusions". Later in 1998, their song "Get on the Bus" featuring Timbaland (which was released as a single in Europe) was included on the Why Do Fools Fall in Love soundtrack.

In 1999, Destiny's Child released their second album The Writing's on the Wall. It became one of the biggest selling albums released by a female group and was certified eight-times platinum in the U.S. The album includes four hit singles, "Bills, Bills, Bills", "Bug a Boo", "Say My Name", and "Jumpin', Jumpin'". LaTavia also gained co-writing contribution more on this album than their first. Roberson performed lead on two songs: "Sweet Sixteen" and "Where'd You Go". Additionally, she sang lead on the song "Can't Help Myself" which was only released on the album's Houston Edition. In late 1999, during the success of The Writing's on the Wall, Roberson and Luckett attempted to bring in a third-party mediator to work with their manager Mathew Knowles; however, they soon found themselves on the outs with Knowles. When the "Say My Name" video debuted in February 2000, the pair learned they'd been replaced by Michelle Williams and Farrah Franklin, which led to several lawsuits with the outcome of Roberson and Luckett being entitled to royalty checks from the previous albums they had made with the group.

While in Destiny's Child, LaTavia appeared in music videos for artists such as Jagged Edge. Roberson performed with the group in live shows, toured as an opening act on TLC's FanMail Tour, and won awards such as Soul Train Music Awards. She also acted in TV shows such as Smart Guy and the movie Beverly Hood alongside the other members.

2001–2003: Anjel 
Following the break-up, Roberson and Luckett won two Grammys for their contribution to Destiny Child's "Say My Name". After that, they formed a group called Anjel with two other girls, Naty Quinones and Tiffany Beaudoin. In 2000, Linda Casey, the mother of Jagged Edge's Brian and Brandon Casey, had held a talent search in Connecticut. This contest would determine the newest member of the group, Natasha Ramos. Due to personality differences, Ramos left the group. Before leaving, she introduced them to Naty Quinones, who auditioned and was added to the group. In February 2001, Anjel attended the Grammys. Later that year, Tiffany Beaudoin was introduced to Anjel by a mutual friend and joined after an audition. They recorded a 22-track demo, planning to release their album, Heavenly, with the help of Jagged Edge. They also appeared in the music video for Jagged Ege's "Where the Party At" remix. The group made one live appearance in 2001 on Good Day, NY; where they talked about the album they were working on and sang part of their song "Missing You". The production company that handled the group fell through and the members went separate ways.

Their label was 581 Entertainment, ran by Jagged Edge under So So Def Recordings, while it was still under Columbia. So So Def owner Jermaine Dupri's decision to leave Columbia caused problems with 581 Entertainment. Before Dupri's move, Anjel's project was on track to be released. The members decided to look into individual projects while group business issues were being handled. In 2003, the record company folded and the group broke up. The group never released Heavenly and split up, before actually recording a full album. The tracks were later leaked on the internet.

2004–2012: Personal endeavors and solo career 
In 2005, LaTavia got invited to replace Kandi in the group Xscape, but passed on the opportunity due to her priority to take care of her family at home in Houston.

In July 2006, it was confirmed by LaTavia herself, that she had been secretly recording her debut album on and off since March 2006. She collaborated with producers such as Scott Storch and hoped to work with Houston rappers Mike Jones and Slim Thug in the future, but was quick to point out it was in no way an attempt to recreate the success of former bandmate LeToya Luckett. Her album called 'Black Summer's Night', a mix of hip-hop meets jazz and soul, with help from Swizz Beatz, Polow da Don, and André 3000 of Outkast, was supposed to appear sometime in 2009 . Unfortunately, she never managed to complete this album, so it was never released.

In 2007, LaTavia and the other former members LeToya Luckett and Farrah Franklin appeared in the TV series Boulevard of Broken Dreams telling their side of the story about what happened during their time with Destiny's Child.

In 2008, LaTavia was in the stage play Those Jeans, which ran from April 18 to July 12. It was described as "a truly well written love story, about a fashion designer and a high fashion photographer, looking for love in all the wrong places".

In 2009, LaTavia featured on the song "Swagga Check" by Young Sween from his album The Goodie Room, released by Fleet Street Records; the song was mistakenly named "Holdin on to You" on iTunes.

In 2010, LaTavia appeared on The Real Housewives of Atlanta speaking to her then-lawyer Phaedra Parks. During this episode, Roberson talked about how she dealt with alcoholic problems and getting in trouble with the law for a DWI.

2013–2015: R&B Divas, stage plays and motherhood 

In 2013, LaTavia starred in J.F. Bailey's stage plays How to Love and Not My Family. That same year, she became a mother for the first time. In 2014, Roberson was added to the main cast of R&B Divas: Atlanta season 3, and her main storyline included being afraid to sing on the show, as she felt she wasn't ready to do so, despite the show being called R&B Divas. Season 3 of R&B Divas consisted of eleven episodes starring LaTavia (including the reunion shows). To promote R&B Divas, she appeared on the Wendy Williams Show in May 2014. In 2015, Roberson announced she had gotten into the hair business with Luxury Hair Direct, which specializes in hair extensions. She also became involved with the charity 'Saving Our Daughters'.

2016–present: Web-series, films, return to music, sports 
In 2016, Roberson started an online YouTube-based series called 'The Online Diary of LaTavia Roberson.'

In 2017, she made her film debut as actress in the horror movie But Deliver Us from Evil, starring Eric Roberts. She also appeared in two additional movies Dirty South House Arrest and The Hills. In spring of 2017, LaTavia confirmed she is set to release her autobiography, I Am LaTavia, which she described as a memoir to her fans. She engaged in a feud with People Magazine after alleging they misquoted and misrepresented her interview online. Roberson released her first song as a solo artist, "Best Time of Your Life", which is an EDM track, on June 23, 2017. In November 2018, she founded Roberson Sports Management, with plans of representing rising boxers. Roberson also launched a boxing magazine called Slugfest Magazine. The first issue, featuring Roy Jones Jr., was published in March 2019.

"Survivor" lawsuit 
In March 2000, Roberson and Luckett filed a lawsuit against Mathew Knowles and the group. This began a media battle in which the two sides exchanged disparaging remarks in magazine and newspaper interviews. Roberson and Luckett agreed to a settlement that required them to drop the part of their lawsuit that targeted their former group members (though they retained the suit against Mathew Knowles) and required both sides to stop disparaging each other in public. Roberson and Luckett later filed another suit against Destiny's Child. They claimed that the single "Survivor" from the group's 2001 album of the same name violated their previous settlement. As evidence, Roberson and Luckett cited lyrics, such as "thought I wouldn't sell without you, sold nine million", which they believed referenced the split. In July 2002, Destiny's Child again settled out of court with the pair.

Personal life 
In 2010, Roberson revealed that she had suffered with an alcohol problem after Destiny's Child. This led to Roberson being arrested for driving while intoxicated. Roberson sought treatment, which led to her recovery, and is using the experience to help others. On August 21, 2013, Roberson gave birth to a daughter with producer Don Vito. In 2016, she suffered the late term pregnancy loss of a baby girl. On September 23, 2019, Roberson's management team announced via Instagram that she had given birth to a boy, her second child with Don Vito.

Discography 
Studio albums with Destiny's Child

 Destiny's Child (1998)
 The Writing's on the Wall (1999)

Collaborative albums
 Heavenly (2003) (unreleased album with Anjel)Singles
 2009 – "Swagga Check" (Young Sween featuring LaTavia Roberson)
 2017 – "Best Time of Your Life"
 2017 – "Baby Love Crazy" (Darryl Allen featuring LaTavia Roberson)
 2018 – Nia featuring Bryant McCarty, Latavia Roberson and Dajione – "Lord's Prayer" (gospel song)

 Filmography 

 Plays 
 Those Jeans (2008)
 How to Love (2013)
 Not My Family (2013)

 Book 
 I Am LaTavia, My Story. My Destiny.'' (TBA)

Grammy Awards 

 2001, Best R&B Song ("Say My Name")
 2001, Best R&B Performance by a Duo or Group with Vocals ("Say My Name")

Notes

References

External links 
 
 
 

1981 births
American women pop singers
American contemporary R&B singers
Destiny's Child members
Living people
Musicians from Atlanta
Musicians from Houston
Singers from Texas
21st-century African-American women singers
American contraltos